Favela Brazilian Cafe is a Brazilian restaurant in Portland, Oregon.

Description 

Favela Brazilian Cafe is a restaurant in southeast Portland's Creston-Kenilworth neighborhood at the border of Foster-Powell. Brooke Jackson-Glidden of Eater Portland described the business as "somewhere between a cafe, a Brazilian market, and a community center, with imported art and products to take home". She has also called Favela "a meeting ground for Brazilian expats and those who want to learn more about the culture".

The cafe serves Brazilian cuisine including pastries, sandwiches, fruits, desserts, coffee (including cafe doce de leite, or butter caramel coffee), juices, and smoothies. The menu has also included pão de queijo (Brazilian cheese bread). The cafe hosts live music and events such as film screenings and Portuguese-language workshops.

History 

Owners Rodrigo Baena and Dunya De Souza opened the restaurant in 2019. Jackson-Glidden said Baena "wanted to create a space for the Brazilian immigrants and aficionados to meet and celebrate the country's culture". The business had a presence at Portland's Come Thru market in 2021.

Reception 
Nathan Williams included Favela in Eater Portland's 2021 overview of "Where to Eat and Drink in Foster-Powell". The website's Zoe Baillargeon included the pão de queijo in a 2021 overview of "Where to Find the Cheesiest Dishes in Portland and Beyond", writing: "Toasty, freshly-baked balls almost always arrive warm and dotted with color, with a springy, soft, cheesy center. Those looking to double-down on dairy can add one of the cafe’s many cheesy sandwiches, whether it’s the melty queijo quente with tomato and oregano or the melty ham-and-cheese misto quente."

References

External links 

 
 
  (October 11, 2019), KPTV

2019 establishments in Oregon
Brazilian restaurants
Brazilian-American culture
Creston-Kenilworth, Portland, Oregon
Restaurants established in 2019
Restaurants in Portland, Oregon